WIFI (1460 AM) is a radio station broadcasting an Urban Top 40 format. The station is located in Florence, New Jersey and serves the Delaware Valley area. The stations studios are located in Burlington, New Jersey

History

20th century
The station received its construction permit as WRLB on June 7, 1984. On February 1, 1992, the station changed its call sign to the current WIFI; it launched later that year. The WIFI call letters had previously been used in the market for some 20 years on the station now known as WXTU. The station previously ran a brokered format under the "MyWifi 1460" brand.

The 1460 frequency had previously been used in Burlington County by WJJZ, a daytime-only station licensed to Mount Holly, New Jersey with a transmitter site on Burlington Island. Two incarnations of WJJZ operated, both losing licenses over corporate indiscretions, between 1963 and 1983.

21st century
In 2008, Florence Broadcasting Partners led by John Forsythe took over operations of the station under a time brokerage agreement with Real Life Broadcasting. On November 1, 2013, the operating contract between Real Life Broadcasting and Florence Broadcasting expired and was not renewed. The station was then operated by Omega Broadcasting, LLC, which programmed gospel music.

In 2013, the station became one of the first broadcast stations to use 100% solar power for its daytime transmissions.

In November 2020, Ritmo Broadcasting began managing WIFI, replacing Christian programming ("Life Radio") with a Contemporary hit radio format, branded "WIFI 92.9". Ritmo Broadcasting acquired WIFI and translator W225DJ effective March 1, 2021, at a purchase price of $275,000.

On April 16, 2021, the station rebranded as "Ritmo 92.9", and began playing Spanish tropical music.

On October 20, 2021, WIFI changed their format from tropical to Spanish adult contemporary, branded as "Amor 92.9" moving the tropical formatted "Ritmo 92.9" over to WPEN-HD3/W253DG. 

On March 24, 2022 at midnight, WIFI once again flipped their format, to Rhythmic CHR, and rebranded back to their old branding of WIFI 92.9. They launched their new website on March 25, 2022. This was short days lived however, on March 29, 2022, WIFI flipped back to its old format as "92.9 Amor" for short days again. But, on April 4, 2022 WIFI flipped back again to Rhythmic CHR. On April 11, 2022, after 2 days of Rhythmic CHR, WIFI went dark. On April 21, 2022, WIFI flipped to urban contemporary as "Jamz 92.9". On March 6, 2023, WIFI slightly adjusted their format to Urban Top 40.

Translators

References

External links

1992 establishments in New Jersey
Companies based in Burlington County, New Jersey
Florence Township, New Jersey
WIFI (AM)
Urban contemporary radio stations in the United States